Harrier may refer to:

Animals
 Harrier (bird), several species of birds
 Harrier (dog)

Media
 Harrier Comics, a defunct British publisher
 Space Harrier, a video game series

Military
 Harrier jump jet, an overview of the Harrier family:
 Hawker Siddeley Harrier, 1st generation Harrier
 British Aerospace Sea Harrier, maritime strike/air defence fighter 
 McDonnell Douglas AV-8B Harrier II, 2nd generation Harrier
 British Aerospace Harrier II, 2nd generation Harrier used by the UK
 Hawker Harrier, experimental biplane torpedo bomber aircraft built in the 1920s

Sport
 Cross-country runner, sometimes referred to as harriers
 Faythe Harriers, an Irish hurling team
 Kidderminster Harriers F.C., an English football team
 One of the following athletics clubs:
 Belgrave Harriers
 Birchfield Harriers

 Coventry Godiva Harriers
 Croydon Harriers
 Eryri Harriers; see Peris Horseshoe
 Hash House Harriers
 Herne Hill Harriers
 Holmfirth Harriers
 Ranelagh Harriers
 Sheffield United Harriers
 Swansea Harriers Athletics Club
 Thames Valley Harriers
 Tipton Harriers

Surname 
 Laura Harrier (born 1990), American actress and former model

Vehicles
 Harrier LR9 Spyder, a sports racing car built in 1994
 Tata Harrier, an compact SUV built since 2018
 Toyota Harrier, a mid-size SUV built since 1997